The Cayman Islands elect a legislature on the territorial level. The Parliament has 21 members, 19 elected members for a four-year term in 19 single member constituencies elected by first past the post and 2 members ex officio. 

In the 2000 elections, with a turnout of 80% only non-partisans were elected. After the election members of parliament formed the United Democratic Party. The Cayman Islands had a no-party system, but it evolved into a two-party system, the opposition United Democratic Party and the current ruling People's Progressive Movement party.

Latest election

See also
 Electoral calendar
 Electoral system

External links
Government election website